Cynthia Maung (born 6 December 1959) is a Burmese medical doctor and founder of Mae Tao Clinic that has been providing free healthcare services for internally displaced persons (IDP) and migrant workers on the Thai-Burmese border for three decades. 

Maung received Southeast Asia's Ramon Magsaysay Award for community leadership and she was listed as one of 2003 Time magazine's Asian Heroes. Altogether she has received six international awards for her work. In 1999, she was the first recipient of the Jonathan Mann Award, sponsored by Swiss and US health organisations.

Early life and education 
Cynthia Maung was born to ethnic Karen parents Mahn Nyein Maung and Hla Kyi in Rangoon, and grew up in Moulmein with her parents and six siblings. Cynthia attended State High School No. 4 and it was during this period that political upheaval and the student movement began to cause disruptions to the education system in Burma. Maung found that many of her friends were dropping out of school, as they needed to work in order to make a little money to assist their family.

In 1977, the Burmese government began to make changes to the educational system which affected universities and colleges, and there were more disruptions to the school year. Maung finished high school that year but had to wait for 10 months before being able to enter the Mawlamyine Regional College where she was required to spend two years before entering medical school. A further 10 months between the regional college and medical school meant that it was 1980 before she was able to commence her medical studies.

Medical career 
After medical school, Maung undertook a one-year internship at the Mawlamyaing General Hospital. It was during this time that Maung began to realise how poor some people were and how much they had to sacrifice in order to get medical care. Many people sold their homes, property and land or animals so that a family member could receive medical assistance.  But still they had to purchase their own supplies such as soap, blades and dressings if they required surgery. Equipment was old and often broken, and items such as syringes were repeatedly used.

From there she went to work in a private clinic in Bassein in the delta area of Burma. It was during this time that the Burmese government decided to change the monetary system. Some of the currency became invalid and many people lost their life savings. This caused suffering for many people and especially for students and the poor. Some schools closed down and the student movement became stronger. Maung's mother became at this time and so she moved back to Moulmein to help care for her and to be close to her family. In 1987, Maung started working in a clinic in Eindu Village in Karen State. The village, which was on the main transit route between Hpa-An and Myawaddy was made up of three main ethnic groups: the Pa-O who earned their living mainly by weaving, the Mon who ran the small shops and businesses, and the Karen who made a small living from farming and agriculture. Living for all of these people was difficult and they all struggled to survive on a daily basis. Maung realised how poor the people were, how little they had and watched as they were forced into working for the military as soldiers and porters. Many village children were not able to attend school and from necessity helped the military in order to make a small amount of money so that they could survive. Taxation was high and diseases such as Tuberculosis widespread. The village had one small hospital but during her stay there was a doctor present for only 2–3 months and there were no medicine or supplies with which to treat the people.

During 1988 the pro-democracy movement and demonstrations increased. Maung joined up with other villagers and high school and university students who had returned to the village. They tried to work together with similar groups from other parts of the country to bring about positive change in Burma. There was a lot of tension, and parents were worried about their children and their safety. Communication and transportation avenues were cut off and the price of rice and commodities went higher and higher. There was confusion and fear among the people. On 19 September 1988 the military seized power, many activists disappeared, fled the country, or were forced to go into hiding. Many thousands of people moved quickly to the Thai–Burma border. On 21 September Dr. Cynthia and fourteen of her colleagues decided it was time for them to go also. With few provisions or personal belongings, they fled through the jungle for seven days. They travelled mainly at night and as they passed through remote villages, where the people had never seen health workers or had access to a hospital, they tried to treat the local people suffering from disease and injury with the limited supplies that they carried.

Mae Tao Clinic 
On arrival in Thailand, Dr. Maung and her friends stopped at Mae La, opposite Be Claw refugee camp in Tha Song Yars district. Here Maung worked at a small hospital treating those fleeing the fighting. There was a lot of confusion as thousands of people tried to find their friends and families. There were many people with many different political ideas, and illnesses such as malaria were rife. Later, Maung moved to Hway Ka Loke refugee camp and it was while she was here that she made contact with Karen leaders responsible for student affairs and with local Thai authorities and church groups who were sympathetic to the plight of these people. Together, they tried to set up some systems to lessen the confusion and to bring a little order to the situation in the area. In November 1988, Maung moved to Mae Sot. She wanted to set up a centre for students needing somewhere to stay or requiring referral for further medical care. Mae Sot had a hospital where this could be done and from this time the Clinic began to develop a referral system with the local hospital which continues today. In February 1989, she was offered a dilapidated building with bare dirt floors on the outskirts of Mae Sot. Here, Dr. Cynthia went to work. Her makeshift clinic had few supplies and money. She improvised by sterilizing her few instruments in a rice cooker and solicited medicine and food from Catholic relief workers working in the area. She and her companions lived simply and worked hard to treat the increasing number of patients coming to the clinic with malaria, respiratory disease and diarrhea as well as gunshot wounds and land mine injuries. Malaria cases are still one of the most common diseases treated by the Mae Tao Clinic. As the years have passed, the type of patient attending the clinic has also changed. In the beginning, it was mainly students and young people escaping the fighting. Gradually, migrant workers began to come to the area in an effort to find work and money for their families at home. As time passed, their wives and families joined them. Today, there are also many children and adolescents who are dropping out of school and need a place of safety. As the population changes, so do the medical needs of those that the clinic serves. Today, one of the highest patient loads is in Reproductive Health and associated areas. Each year, over 2,700 babies are delivered at the clinic. The clinic's facilities and activities continue to grow. Currently, between 400 - 500 people on average come to the clinic each day, and there is a staff of about 700 providing comprehensive health services and child protection services. Total caseload exceeds 115,000 cases annually with a client number of over 75,000 per year.

Health services 
Mae Tao Clinic provides inpatient and outpatient medical care for adults, children, reproductive health clients and surgical service patients. Other services include eye care, dental care, laboratory and blood bank services, prosthetics and rehabilitation, voluntary counseling and testing for HIV and counseling services. Severe cases (less than 1%) are referred to Mae Sot Hospital. Antiretroviral treatment and prevention of mother to child transmission of HIV is also conducted in collaboration with Mae Sot Hospital.  Since the establishment of the Clinic, Thai Ministry of Public Health, Mae Sot Hospital and Mae Tao Clinic share information and experiences and have developed a positive working relationship. The Clinic also supports small satellite clinics set up in Burma, particularly in the IDP areas, to assist those who cannot reach the Clinic.

Awards
2018 - UNDP's N-Peace Award
2018 - Roux Prize
2013 - Sydney Peace Prize
2012 - National Endowment for Democracy's 2012 Democracy Award
2009 - Inspiration Model Award from "Khon Khon Khon", Thai Television Programme
2008 - Catalonia International Prize along with Aung San Suu Kyi 
2007 - Asia Democracy and Human Rights Award (Taiwan Foundation for Democracy)
2007 - World's Children's Prize for the Rights of the Child Honorary Award (Children's World Association, Sweden)
2005 - Nominated as part of the 1,000 Women Nobel Peace Prize Nomination
2005 - Unsung Heroes of Compassion Award from the Dalai Lama and Wisdom in Action
2005 - The Eighth Global Concern for Human Life Award
2005 - Included in Time November article on 18 Global Health Heroes
2002 - Magsaysay Award for community leadership
2001 - Foundation for Human Rights in Asia Special Award
2001 - Van Heuven Goedhart Award
1999 - Jonathan Mann Health and Human Rights Award
1999 - American Women's Medical Association President's Award
1999 - John Humphrey Freedom Award

Family 
Cynthia Maung has been married to Kyaw Hein since 1992. Together, they have four children: Nyein Chan Maung, May Thant  Sin Maung, May Sabel Kyaw and Aye Chan Maung.

Research 

"Community-based assessment of human rights in a complex humanitarian emergency: the Emergency Assistance Teams-Burma and Cyclone Nargis" by Voravit Suwanvanichkij, Noriyuki Murakamil, Catherine I Lee, Jen Leigh, Andrea L Wirtz, Brock Daniels, Mahn Mahn, Cynthia Maung and Chris Beyrer:  http://www.conflictandhealth.com/content/4/1/8
"Mobile Obstetrics Project Improves Health of Mothers in Eastern Burma" Mullany et al., (August 2010): http://www.jhsph.edu/publichealthnews/press_releases/2010/mullany_burma_mom_project.html
"After the Storm: Voices from the Delta" by Voravit Suwanvanichkij, Mahn Mahn, Cynthia Maung, Brock Daniels, Noriyuki Murakami, Andrea Wirtz and Chris Beyrer (February 2009) https://web.archive.org/web/20110429185734/http://www.jhsph.edu/humanrights/locations/asia/BurmaCyclone.html
"Access To Essential Maternal Health Interventions and Human Rights Violations among Vulnerable Communities in Eastern Burma" by Luke C. Mullany, Catherine I. Lee, Lin Yone, Palae Paw, Eh Kalu Shwe Oo, Cynthia Maung, Thomas J. Lee and Chris Beyrer (December 2008): http://www.burmalibrary.org/docs6/Access_To_Essential_Maternal_Health.pdf
"Working our Way Back Home: Fertility and Pregnancy Loss on the Thai-Burmese Border" by Cynthia Maung and Suzanne Belton (December 2005) http://www.ibiblio.org/obl/docs3/OurWay.pdf

References

External links 

Seattle Times biography
University of Washington
Mae Tao Clinic website
Dr. Cynthia's Mae Tao Clinic home page
Cynthia Maung  Freedom Collection interview

1959 births
Living people
Burmese physicians
Burmese women physicians
Burmese people of Karen descent
Burmese human rights activists
Cynthia Maung
Cynthia Maung
People from Yangon Region
Ramon Magsaysay Award winners
Burmese emigrants to Thailand
Burmese Baptists
University of Medicine 2, Yangon alumni